Cavaleiro Sports is a Brazilian professional auto racing team based in Guarulhos, São Paulo. The team currently competes in Stock Car Brasil and Brazilian F4.

External links
  

Stock Car Brasil teams
Auto racing teams established in 2013
Brazilian auto racing teams